Ferdinand Truyman(1857-1939) was a Belgian architect well known for his art nouveau building designs. He was active particularly in Antwerp.

Gallery

References

1857 births
1939 deaths
Belgian architects